John Clifford Strong (14 January 1922 – 24 September 2003) was Governor of the Turks and Caicos from August 1978 to September 1982. Strong was succeeded by Christopher J. Turner in October 1982. He died in September 2003 at the age of 81.

References

1922 births
2003 deaths
Governors of the Turks and Caicos Islands
People educated at Beckenham and Penge County Grammar School